The Return of the Prodigal Son (translit. Awdat Al Ibn Aldal) is a 1976 Egyptian drama film directed by direcor Youssef Chahine.

Plot 
Ali, the son of a prominent family in a rural town, returns after being gone for 12 years. The hopes of his family and the town itself were pinned to his success in Cairo. But due to a series of events in a failed architectural scheme that resulted in a tower collapsing, he was jailed for 3 years. At home, he experiences the warm reception of his father, mother, his would-be bride, and nephew. But excitement soon turns to delusion as the family and the town sees that he will not be able to fix the failures of the family's company and the economic backbone of the town. Eventually at his own wedding, Ali takes a gun and shoots down his brother and mother. Ali's brother, Tolba, manages to shoot Ali before they both succumb to their wounds. Only the nephew, Ibrahim, manages to escape the carnage and leaves to pursue a science degree in Alexandria.

Cast 
 Shoukry Sarhan as Tolba
 Majida El Roumi as Tafida
 Souheir El Morshdy as Fatima
 Huda Sultan as The Mother
 Mahmoud el-Meliguy as The Father
 Ahmad Mehrez as Ali
 Hesham Selim as Ibrahim

See also 
 Cinema of Egypt
 Lists of Egyptian films
 List of Egyptian films of the 1970s
 List of Egyptian films of 1976

References

External links 
 
 
 
 The Return of the Prodigal Son on elCinema.com

1970s Arabic-language films
1976 films
1976 drama films
Egyptian drama films
Films directed by Youssef Chahine
Films shot in Egypt